Matteo Pertsch (1769–1834) was an Austrian classical architect best known for designing a number of structures in Trieste built in the early decades of the 19th century.

He was born in Buchhorn (now Friedrichshafen, Germany) to a family of German origin. In 1790 he went to Milan to study in the Brera Academy of Fine Arts. While there, he was a student of celebrated Italian architect Giuseppe Piermarini.

Pertsch married Maddalena Vogel in 1802, who gave him three daughters and four sons. Three of the four sons continued in their father's craft as architects.

Notable buildings
Teatro Lirico Giuseppe Verdi (1798–1801)
Palazzo Carciotti (1802–1805)
Rotonda Pancera (1818)
Greek Orthodox Church of San Nicolò dei Greci (1819–1820)

Gallery

External links

1769 births
1834 deaths
18th-century Austrian architects
19th-century Austrian architects
Austrian people of German descent
People from Friedrichshafen
Architects from Trieste